The 2023–24 SuperLiga will be the 106th season of the Superliga, the top professional league for Romanian association football clubs. The season starts on July 2023 and will end in May 2024. It is the eighth season to take place since the play-off/play-out format has been introduced.

After the conclusion of the regular season, teams will be divided according to their place to enter either the championship play-offs or the relegation play-outs.

The teams ranked 15th and 16th at the end of the play-out tournament will be directly relegated, while the 13th and 14th places played a promotion/relegation play-off against 3rd and 4th places from Liga II.

Regular season 
In the regular season the 16 teams will meet twice for a total of 30 matches per team, with the top 6 advancing to the Championship play-offs and the bottom 10 qualifying for the relegation play-outs.

Table 

Liga I seasons
2023–24 in Romanian football
2023–24 in European association football leagues